Elachista subocellea is a moth of the family Elachistidae. It is found from Fennoscandia to the Iberian Peninsula, Italy and Romania and from Ireland to Poland.

The wingspan is .Differs from E. collitella as follows : forewings whiter, costa not distinctly fuscous towards base, plical and second discal stigmata sometimes distinct, black.

Adults are on wing from June to July.

The larvae feed internally on leaves of false-brome and tor-grass. First, the larvae create a narrow ascending corridor. The direction reverses and the mine develops into a broad, greenish, inconspicuous blotch, reminding of a tentiform mine. Pupation takes place outside of the mine.

References

subocellea
Leaf miners
Moths described in 1834
Moths of Europe
Taxa named by James Francis Stephens